Vatelizumab is an immunomodulator. It binds to integrin alpha 2.

It was withdrawn from Phase II trials for inflammatory bowel disease due to a lack of efficacy.

References 

Monoclonal antibodies
Abandoned drugs